The 2016 Indonesia Soccer Championship B is the inaugural season of the Indonesia Soccer Championship B, a football competition that replaced the temporarily-suspended Liga Indonesia Premier Division. This competition started in 30 April 2016.

PSCS Cilacap became champion after beating PSS Sleman 4-3 after extra time in the final.

Teams 
Indonesia Soccer Championship B was competed for by 53 clubs from 2015 Liga Indonesia Premier Division. But later on, PS Badung Bali and Persires Rengat withdrew from the tournament.

Stadiums and locations

First round 
The first round will be held on 30 April-4 September 2016. All groups will play home and away round-robin tournament.

Group 1

Group 2

Group 3

Group 4

Group 5

Group 6

Group 7

Group 8

Second round 
The second round will be held on 30 September-14 November 2016. All groups will play home and away round-robin tournament.

Group A 

Perssu Super Madura awarded 3-0 win over PSIM Yogyakarta that failed to host the match 
due to not get permission from the police

Group B

Group C

Group D

Knockout stage
The knockout stage will be held on 9–22 December 2016.

Quarter-finals 
Matches for Quarter-finals will be played at 9–10 December 2016. All matches will be held in Gelora Bumi Kartini, Jepara

Semi-finals 
Matches for Semi-finals will be played at 14 December 2016. All matches will be held in Gelora Bumi Kartini, Jepara

Third Place 
Matches for Third Place Play-off will be played at 17 December 2016 and will be held in Manahan, Surakarta

Final 
Matches for Final will be played at 22 December 2016 and will be held in Gelora Bumi Kartini, Jepara

Champions

See also
 2016 Indonesia Soccer Championship A
 2016 Liga Nusantara
 2016 Indonesia Soccer Championship U-21
 2016 Soeratin Cup

References

External links
Indonesia Soccer Championship official site 

Indonesia
Indonesia
2016 in Indonesian sport